Donald Alfred Tannas (born April 25, 1938) is a former provincial politician from Alberta, Canada. He served as a Member of the Alberta Legislature from 1989 until 2004. He was born in Marwayne, Alberta.

Political history
Tannas has a long history of being politically active. He ran for the Progressive Conservative nomination for Highwood in 1974 but lost to George Wolstenholme. He worked on the campaigns for Wolstenholme and later Harry Alger. He worked to fund-raise for the party and later served as President of the Highwood PC Association. After Alger announced his retirement, he ran for the PC nomination again in 1989 and won.

Tannas was first elected to the Alberta Legislature in the 1989 Alberta general election. He won a comfortable majority holding the Highwood electoral district for the Progressive Conservatives over Don Dearle of the Liberals and Janice Belgum of the New Democrats. He won his second term with a landslide majority in the 1993 Alberta general election defeating three other candidates. Tannas improved his plurality to sweep into office for a third term in the 1997 Alberta general election. Tannas won the biggest plurality of his political career taking almost 80% of the vote in the 2001 Alberta general election. He served as Deputy Speaker in his fourth term. He retired at the dissolution of the Assembly in 2004.

His son Scott Tannas is currently an elected Senator for the province of Alberta.

References

External links
Legislative Assembly of Alberta Members Listing

1938 births
Living people
Progressive Conservative Association of Alberta MLAs
21st-century Canadian politicians